Confessions of a Torpe is a Filipino drama series aired by TV5 on March 3, 2014, replacing Madam Chairman. It stars Ogie Alcasid, Gelli de Belen and Alice Dixson.

Cast
Main cast
Ogie Alcasid as Christopher "Tupe" Matacutin
Alice Dixson as Monique Salcedo
Gelli de Belen  as Luzviminda "Luz" Mabuti

Supporting cast
Bayani Agbayani as Adonis Pante
Jojo Alejar as Santo Lorenzo Ruiz
Wendell Ramos as Peter "Mr. Big" Malaqui
Carmina Manzano as Osang Salcedo
Pilita Corrales as Ligaya Salcedo
Bibeth Orteza as Pasencia "Aling Pacing" Catacutan
Mark Neumann as Hanley Kubrick
Shaira Mae dela Cruz as Lovely Mabuti
Albie Casiño as Jack Malaqui
Mike Lloren as Lito Mabuti
Gerard Acao as Reggie

Guest cast
Dominic Ochoa as Torpe De Guzman
IC Mendoza as Verca
Dennis Padilla as John
Alyssa Alano as Shirley
Rufa Mi as Roxanne
Marvelous Alejo as Yumi
Patani Daño as Jhunalyn
Kuhol as Nick
Tiya Pusit as Aling Rosing
Flora Gasser as Vendor
Mark Anthony Robrigado as Mark
Boobie as Patty
Francine "Kim Chiu" Garcia as Denice Kuneho
Jasper Visaya as Cedie
Lou Veloso as Barangay Chairman
Caloy Alde as Tanod
JC Parker as Bernadette Supsup
KC Montero as Radio DJ
Mon Confiado as Ramon
Pau Chavez as Aicha
Jana Victoria as Beauty
Lilia Cuntapay as Beauty's Nanny
Wendy Valdez as Virginia
Phoemela Baranda as Christine Zulueta
DJ Durano as Direk Thor
Negi as Brittney
Shalala as Bugsy
Nanding Josef as Lolo Grumpy
Ethel Booba as Sue
Boom Vergara as Harry
Valeen Montenegro as Lizzy
Mel Martinez as Nelson Torero
Leo Martinez as Bill Salcedo
Raquel Villavicencio as Hilary Salcedo
Jasmine Curtis-Smith as Jasmine
Derek Ramsay as Hunk

See also
List of programs aired by The 5 Network

References

External links

Philippine drama television series
2014 Philippine television series debuts
2014 Philippine television series endings
TV5 (Philippine TV network) drama series
Philippine comedy-drama television series
Filipino-language television shows